Senator Ruben S. Ayala Senior High School, often abbreviated as Ayala High School or AHS, is located in Chino Hills, California. It is one of the four comprehensive high schools in the Chino Valley Unified School District. The school was established in 1990 and named after California state senator Ruben S. Ayala. It received the 2011 California Distinguished School award and the 2015 California Gold Ribbon School Award.

Academics

Course Offerings

The 28 AP classes offered for the 2022–23 year are:
AP Biology,
AP Calculus AB,
AP Calculus BC, AP Statistics, AP Environmental Science,
AP Chemistry,
AP Chinese Language,
AP English Language,
AP English Literature,
AP French Language,
AP Macroeconomics/AP Microeconomics,
AP Music Theory,
AP Physics 1, AP Physics 2,
AP Spanish Language,
AP Studio Art, AP Studio Art 2-D,
AP US Government and Politics, AP European History, AP Psychology
AP US History, AP Computer Science A, AP Computer Science Principles, AP Human Geography, AP Comparative Government and Politics, AP Seminar, and AP Research.

The languages offered at Ayala are American Sign Language, Chinese, French, and Spanish.

Class sizes
The average class sizes for the 2010–2011 school year:
English-Language Arts: 27.3
Mathematics: 24.2
Science: 30.2
History-Social Science: 34.7

Enrollment trends
Enrollment at Ayala High School started out at around 1,000 freshmen and sophomores  in 1991 and grew to 3,696 students before Chino Hills High School opened in 2001. After that, enrollment dropped to around 2,400 students, with a graduating class of about 600 students each year.

Test Scores
Of the 500 AP exams given out to 300 students in the 2010–2011 school year, 2.20% scored 3 or above.

The following table lists the percent of students who scored Proficient or above on their STAR Test.

The following are the percentage of those who passed the CAHSEE test in their 10th Grade:

Ayala's API score in the 2011–2012 school year was 845, 13 points up from the year before (2010–2011).

The graduation rate for this school in the 2010–2011 school year is 98.3%.

SkillsUSA
Ayala was home to a SkillsUSA chapter. The last engineering/architecture teacher, Mr. Trent Munsey, retired after the 2009–2010 school year. Ayala also participated in the Solar Cup, a competition in which schools build a solar-powered boat from scratch. In the 2010 SkillsUSA California State Conference, 9 students received gold medals, 7 students received silver medals, and 1 student received a bronze medal.

Awards and certifications
Ayala High School was ranked 1,183rd in the nation in 2006 by Newsweek Magazine.

In April 2010, Ayala's USB Leadership Program received the California Association of Student Leaders Outstanding Activities Program Award. Ayala High School received the 2011 and 2019 California Distinguished School award, 2015 California Gold Ribbon School award, and is accredited by the Western Association of Schools and Colleges.

Performing Arts

Drama

 Drama has 10–12 productions per year. There are 3 main stage shows: Fall Drama, Comedy, and Musical. There are also 3 shows produced by the Advanced Arts classes. There are also at least 3 shows produced by the Beginning Theater Arts Classes. Finally, there is one production and performance by the highest level class.

Band and Colorguard

 
The Ayala Band and Colorguard (BAC) is regionally and nationally recognized performance ensemble. They have attended competitions such as the Western Band Association (WBA) field tournaments and Grand Championships (placing 1st in the 5A Class division in 2011, 2012, and 2015) as well as attended several Bands of America (BOA) events; Regional Championships since 1999 (placing 1st in 2006, 2007, 2008, 2009, 2010, 2012, 2013, 2014, 2015, 2018, and 2019 in California, and 2018 in St. George, Utah), Super Regional Championships in 2003 in San Antonio, Texas), and Grand National Championships in Indianapolis, Indiana in 2004, 2007, 2010, 2013, 2016, and 2019 (placing in the top 12 Finalists in 2004, 2013, and 2019).
The Ayala BAC were Class AAA Champions at the Western Band Association Grand Championships in 1997. 
In 2004, The Ayala BAC attended the Bands of America Grand National Championships in Indianapolis, Indiana, where they were a top 12 Finalist This was their 1st appearance at the event. As an unpublished category in the music caption score, the percussion section placed 1st in finals.
The Ayala BAC took 3rd place in the 2008 Western Band Association Grand Championships in Pleasant Hill, California.
The Ayala BAC took 2nd place in the 2009 Western Band Association Grand Championships in Fresno, California.
In the 2010 Bands of America Grand National Championships held in Indianapolis, Indiana, the Ayala BAC placed 18th in semi-finals.
The Ayala BAC placed 1st in both the Class 5A competition and the Combined 4A/5A Finals competition in the 2011 Western Band Association Grand Championships in Santa Barbara, California.
The Ayala BAC was undefeated, winning 1st place at every field show they competed in during the 2012 season.
The Ayala BAC tied for 1st place with James Logan High School in the 5A Class competition of the 2012 Western Band Association Grand Championships in Fresno, California. Due to a tie-breaking rule, which states that in the event of a tie, the band with the higher general effect score is the winner, the Ayala BAC won against James Logan High School, which was the second year in a row that James Logan had placed 2nd to the Ayala BAC.
In 2014, the Ayala BAC placed 1st in Class 5A competition, and placed 2nd at the Combined 4A/5A Finals competition in the 2014 Western Band Association Championships.
In 2015, the Ayala BAC's win at the Bands of America Regional Championship in Long Beach, California set the record for most consecutive Regional Championship wins with 9, breaking the record of 8 held by Centerville High School from Centerville, Ohio. This record was broken the next year by Broken Arrow High School, with 10 consecutive wins.
In 2015, the Ayala BAC maintained an undefeated season and won 1st place in both the Class 5A competition and the Combined 4A/5A Finals competition at the 2015 Western Band Association Grand Championships in Fresno, California. The percussion section scored the highest ever score in the percussion caption during finals, with a 9.9.
In 2016, the Ayala BAC once again traveled to Indianapolis, Indiana to compete in the Bands of America Grand National Championships, where they placed 19th in semi-finals.
In 2017, the Ayala BAC placed 2nd during both the Class 5A competition and the Combined 4A/5A Finals competition at the 2017 Western Band Association Grand Championships in Fresno, California.
In May 2018, Director of Bands Mark Stone retired after 28 years with the program, having founded it in 1990 when the school was first established. His successor is Tim Trost.
In the fall of 2018, the Ayala BAC won 2 consecutive Bands of America Regional Championships for the 1st time in the program's history, winning both the St. George, Utah Regional Championship and the Southern California Regional Championship in Valley Glen, California. These 2 wins also make the Ayala BAC the band with the most Regional Championship wins on the West Coast, with a total of 11.
In 2019, the Ayala BAC won their 12th Bands of America Regional Championship at the California Regional Championship at Bakersfield College, in Bakersfield, California.
In 2019, the Ayala BAC made their 6th appearance at the Bands of America Grand National Championships in Indianapolis, Indiana, where they were a top 12 Finalist. This marks the 2nd time a California band has made 3 appearances in the competitions Finals since Etiwanda High School did so in the 1990s.

Indoor Percussion Ensembles
The Ayala Marching Percussion Ensemble and Ayala Concert Percussion Ensemble are nationally recognized winter/indoor performing groups. The Ayala Marching Percussion Ensemble currently competes in the Percussion Scholastic World (PSW) class, while the Ayala Concert Percussion Ensemble currently competed in the Percussion Scholastic Concert World class (PSCW). The Ayala Marching Percussion Ensemble and Ayala Concert Percussion Ensemble both compete in the Southern California Percussion Alliance circuit as well as the Winter Guard International circuit's Percussion Division. In 2007, the Ayala Concert Percussion Ensemble placed 1st at the 2007 Winter Guard International Percussion World Championships in Dayton, Ohio. One of the music judges gave them a perfect score, which was the 1st time in Winter Guard International history that a perfect music score had been awarded.

* Did not attend

** Event / season cancelled due to COVID-19 pandemic

*** Event did not exist

* Did not attend

** Event / season cancelled due to COVID-19 pandemic

Winterguard 
The Ayala Winterguard has two performing groups: the JV Guard and the Varsity Guard. Both the JV Guard and Varsity Guard are nationally recognized performing groups.
The following year, the 2010 JV Guard moved up 2 divisions in the Western Guard Association of Southern California (WGASC) circuit and up 3 divisions in the Winter Guard International circuit, and managed to win double gold medals in the 2010 WGASC Championships. The Varsity Guard also placed 3rd at that year's WGASC Championships.
In 2011, the Varsity Guard was awarded 1st place at a local Winter Guard International Color Guard Regional Championship and 2nd place at the Winter Guard International Color Guard Western Power Regional Championship in San Diego, California.
At the end of the 2011 season, both the JV and Varsity Guard won 2nd place at the 2011 WGASC Championships.
During 2012, the Varsity Guard placed 3rd at the Winter Guard International Color Guard Regional Championship in Riverside, California and 2nd at the Winter Guard International Color Guard Western Power Regional Championship in San Diego, California.
In 2012, the Varsity Guard placed 2nd while the JV Guard won 1st place in the 2012 WGASC Championships.
In 2019, the Varsity Guard won 1st in World Class at the Winter Guard International Color Guard Regional Championship in Las Vegas, Nevada, as well as WGASC Championships.

* Did not attend

** Event / season cancelled due to COVID-19 pandemic

*** Attended event, did not make Finals

Sports

Ruben S. Ayala High School is a member of the California Interscholastic Federation Sierra League in the Southern Section (CIF-SS), school will now compete in the Palomares League starting in the 2014–15 school year.
The campus has a swimming pool, 6 tennis courts, an indoor gym, pitching cages, 2 baseball fields, a weight room, and a stadium.
A documentary has been made about the 2010–2011 Ayala Wrestling Team.
In June 2011, varsity football coach Tom Inglima, who was named Inland Valley's Coach of the Year in 2007, was transferred to Chino High School.
The table below lists the years a sport has made Sierra League/Palomares, CIF-Southern Section (CIF-SS), and CIF (State). For CIF-SS and CIF, unless otherwise noted, the sport has won that level in that year.
2014 - 2015 was the inaugural year for the Palomares League (formerly known as the Sierra League).
The girls' basketball team won the CIF-Southern Section Division 2AA title in 2007 with coach Mel Sims.
On March 5, 2016, the boys' basketball team won the CIF-Southern Section Division 2A Championship by defeating Edison High School of Huntington Beach by the score of 63–49 at the Honda Center in Anaheim.

Legend: Qtr – Quarterfinals, SF – Semifinals

Notable alumni

A Static Lullaby – post-hardcore band from Chino Hills, CA.
 K. C. Asiodu – National Football League player for the New Orleans Saints
 Jeff Bajenaru - former MLB baseball pitcher
 Karen Bardsley – goalkeeper for England women's national football team
 Obum Gwacham – football defensive end
 Mike Randolph – professional soccer player who played for the Los Angeles Galaxy of Major League Soccer.
 Marquise Wilson – actor, Hangin' with Mr Cooper

References

External links

Official website
Ayala Choir
Ayala Band and Colorguard
Ayala Percussion
Sports (Those with dedicated websites)
Ayala Sports Home Page
Ayala Cross Country
Ayala Track and Field
Ayala Football
Ayala Baseball

High schools in San Bernardino County, California
Chino Hills, California
Public high schools in California
1990 establishments in California